Saint Alina may refer to:

 Saint Alena, born in Dilbeek, Belgium, and martyred c. 640
 Blessed Alina Martain, a Benedictine nun who died in 1125
 Blessed Michelina of Pesaro, a Franciscan penitent who died 19 June 1356.